IT University is a joint department between Chalmers University of Technology and the University of Gothenburg in Sweden. This joint venture offers a great scope for cooperation between researchers with different areas of expertise and academic specialties within the field of information technology.

The programmes offered are based on advanced research and are in a constant state of development. IT University was established in the autumn of 2001. Today it offers programs at both Bachelor's and Master's level, mostly with a focus on applied information technology.

Programs in English 
 C:Art:Media Master Program 
 Intelligent Systems Design
 Master's in Software Engineering and Management 
 Software Engineering and Management International
 MSc in Applied Data Science

External links
 IT University website 

Educational institutions established in 2001
Chalmers University of Technology
University of Gothenburg
Information technology organizations
Information technology education
Joint ventures
2001 establishments in Sweden